Niagara is an unincorporated community in Henderson County, Kentucky, United States.

The country singer Grandpa Jones was born in Niagara.

References

Unincorporated communities in Henderson County, Kentucky
Unincorporated communities in Kentucky